Sagres is a city in the state of São Paulo in Brazil. The population in 2020 was 2,430 and the area is 149.37 km². The elevation is 419 m.

References

Municipalities in São Paulo (state)